Albert Rusnák (born 14 January 1974) is a Slovak former football player and manager. His son is Albert Rusnák, who currently plays for American Major League Soccer club Seattle Sounders FC.

As a footballer, Rusnak senior was a member of the Kosice side which won the Slovak league title in 1997 and retained it a year later. However, he suffered fractures to both legs in a car crash on 2 December 1997 which claimed the life of Kosice midfielder Milan Čvirk. Rusnak played in some of Kosice's Champions League fixtures during the 1997-98 season, including the group stage clash with Manchester United at Old Trafford shortly before the crash.

References

External links
 MFK Zemplín Michalovce profile
 

1974 births
Sportspeople from Prešov
Living people
Slovak footballers
Slovak football managers
Slovak expatriate footballers
Association football forwards
1. FC Tatran Prešov players
FK Drnovice players
FC VSS Košice players
Slovak Super Liga players
MFK Zemplín Michalovce managers
Expatriate footballers in the Czech Republic
Manchester City F.C. non-playing staff